Chittem Narsi Reddy (died 15 August 2005) was an Indian political leader. He was member of Indian National Congress. He was only member of Janata Dal in Andhra Pradesh Legislative Assembly. He was elected from Makthal constituency in 1984 on Janata Party ticket and in 1989 on Janata Dal ticket.

References

2005 deaths
Andhra Pradesh politicians
1950s births
Indian National Congress politicians from Andhra Pradesh
Janata Dal politicians
Janata Party politicians
Year of birth missing
20th-century Indian politicians